
The Avia BH-16 was a single-seat very light sport aircraft built in Czechoslovakia in 1924. Like other early Avia designs, it was a low-wing braced monoplane of wooden construction. It could be powered by either a  four-cylinder Vaslin engine or a   inverted-V twin-Blackburne Tomtit.

Specifications (Vaslin engine)

References

 
 Němeček, V. (1968). Československá letadla. Praha: Naše Vojsko.

1920s Czechoslovakian sport aircraft
BH-16
Low-wing aircraft
Single-engined tractor aircraft
Aircraft first flown in 1924